Sir Tore Lokoloko  (21 September 1930 – 13 March 2013) was a Papua New Guinean politician who served as the second governor-general of Papua New Guinea from 1977 to 1983. He was governor-general during Queen Elizabeth's Silver Jubilee visit to the country, when he was appointed GCVO and GCMG.

Lokoloko was born in the village of Iokea, Papua (now in Gulf Province, Papua New Guinea). He was the son of Paramount Chief Lokoloko Tore, and attended the Sogeri School, set up by the former Australian administrators in 1944.

Like Sir John Guise, Lokoloko had been a member of the House of Assembly of Papua and New Guinea prior to self-government, from 1968 to 1972. He was selected to replace Guise as Governor-General on 18 February 1977, and remained in that position through 1 March 1983. He later became the chairman of Indosuez Niugine Bank, a position he remained in through 1989. Lokoloko died on 13 March 2013 of respiratory failure after a severe asthma attack.

References 

 Lentz, Harris M., III. Heads of States and Governments. Jefferson, NC: McFarland & Company, 1994. .

1930 births
2013 deaths
Governors-General of Papua New Guinea
Knights Grand Cross of the Order of St Michael and St George
Knights Grand Cross of the Royal Victorian Order
Officers of the Order of the British Empire
Grand Companions of the Order of Logohu
People from Gulf Province